The Mad Adventures of Rabbi Jacob is a 1973 French-Italian comedy film directed by Gérard Oury, starring Louis de Funès and Claude Giraud. It follows a bigoted businessman and a kidnapped revolutionist who disguise themselves as rabbis to escape from assassins. One of De Funès' most popular and iconic movies, it has become a cult classic.

Plot
Rabbi Jacob (Marcel Dalio) is one of the most beloved rabbis of New York. One day, the French side of his family, the Schmolls, invite him to celebrate the bar mitzvah of young David, and he boards a plane for his native France after more than 30 years of American life. His young friend Rabbi Samuel accompanies him.

In Normandy (northern France), the rich businessman Victor Pivert (Louis de Funès) is also on his way to a wedding; his daughter (Miou-Miou) will be married the next day. Pivert is a dreadful man: bad-tempered, rude and bigoted, with a well-honed racism against Blacks, Jews, and pretty much all foreigners. He and his driver, Salomon (Henri Guybet), have a car accident in which Pivert's car (carrying a speed boat) flips upside-down into a lake. When Salomon, who is Jewish, refuses to help because Shabbat has just begun, Pivert fires him, much to Salomon's content.

Arab revolutionist leader Mohamed Larbi Slimane (Claude Giraud) is kidnapped by killers who are working for his country's government. The team, led by Colonel Farès, takes him by night to an empty bubble gum factory... the same place where Victor Pivert goes to find assistance. Pivert involuntarily helps Slimane to flee, leaving two killers' corpses behind them. The police, alerted by Salomon, find the bodies and accuse Pivert of the crime.

The next day, Slimane forces Pivert to go to Orly airport to catch a plane to Slimane's country (if the revolution succeeds, he will become President). However, they are followed by a number of people: the jealous Germaine, Pivert's wife, who thinks her husband is going to leave her for another woman; Farès and the killers; and the police commissioner Andréani (Claude Piéplu), a zealous and overly suspicious cop who imagines that Pivert is the new Al Capone. Farès and his cohorts manage to kidnap Germaine, and they use her own dentist equipment to interrogate her.

Trying to conceal his and Pivert's identities, Slimane attacks two rabbis in the toilets, stealing their clothes and shaving their beards and their payot. The disguises are perfect, and they are mistaken for Rabbi Jacob and Rabbi Samuel by the Schmoll family. The only one who recognizes Pivert (and Slimane) behind the disguise is Salomon, his former driver, who just happens to be a Schmoll nephew. But Pivert and Slimane are able to keep their identity secret and even manage to hold a sermon in Hebrew, thanks to the polylingual Slimane, as well as taking part in a very energetic Hasidic dance, one of the memorable scenes from the film.

After a few misunderstandings, Commissioner Andréani and his two inspectors are mistaken by the Jews for terrorists, attempting to kill Rabbi Jacob. The real Rabbi Jacob arrives at Orly, where no one is waiting for him any more. He is mistaken for Victor Pivert by the police, then by Farès and his killers (both times in a painful way for his long beard).

There is a chaotic, but sweeping happy ending:

the revolution is a success, and Slimane becomes President of the Republic
Pivert's daughter falls in love with Slimane and escapes her dull fiancé near the altar to go with him
Pivert learns tolerance towards other religions and cultures, and also Salomon and Slimane make peace with their respective Arab and Jewish colleagues
the Schmolls finally find the real Rabbi Jacob
the Piverts and the Schmolls go together feasting and celebrating

Cast

 Louis de Funès - Victor Pivert
 Suzy Delair - Germaine Pivert
 Claude Giraud - Mohamed Larbi Slimane / Rabbi Zeligman
 Henri Guybet - Salomon
 Marcel Dalio - Rabbi Jacob
 Renzo Montagnani - Colonel Farès
 Janet Brandt - Tzipé Schmoll
 André Falcon - The minister
 Xavier Gélin - Alexandre
 Miou-Miou - Antoinette Pivert
 Denise Provence - Esther Schmoll
 Claude Piéplu - Andreani
 Michel Robin - The monk
 Jacques François - The general
 Gérard Darmon - Farès's bodyguard
 Cherif Adnane - Farés's bodyguard
 El Kabir - Fares's bodyguard
 Malek Kateb - Fares's bodyguard
 Pierre Koulak - Fares's bodyguard
 Noël Darzal - Fares's bodyguard
 Lucien Melki - Fares's bodyguard
 Dominique Zardi

Release 
On the day of the film's release, October 18, 1973, while Georges Cravenne, the films publicity agent, was promoting the film, his second wife Danielle Cravenne hijacked an Air France B727 which was en route from Paris to Egypt. Armed with a .22 long rifle and a fake pistol, she threatened to destroy the plane if the film was not banned. Cravenne declared herself to be a member of the solidarity movement for the French-Israeli-Arab reconciliation and considered the film's release unacceptable as it was being released during the Yom Kippur War. Cravenne agreed to let the plane land in Marseille to refuel. French police disguised as maintenance workers boarded the plane and shot and killed her. Cravenne was 35-years-old. The Mad Adventures of Rabbi Jacob was still released.

Reception

Critical Response 
The Mad Adventures of Rabbi Jacob received universal acclaim from critics and was nominated for a Golden Globes Award in the category of Best Foreign Film. It is widely regarded as one of the most popular French comedies of all time. Phil Hall of Film Threat called it, "A masterpiece of slapstick", stating that "This wild movie achieves the near-impossible of being politically incorrect without being nasty, of overdoing the slapstick without becoming tiresome." Roger Moore of Movie Nation stated:  "Pre-Blazing Saddles and Airplane!, Rabbi Jacob could claim to having more gags-per-minute than any film anybody had ever seen." Judith Cris of New York Magazine was equally enthusiastic upon its release, "Rabbi Jacob is the best of the Chaplin-Marx Bros. spirit, sustained by a touch of satire here and a wink there."

Box Office 
The film broke box-office records in France, Spain and Canada. A total of 7,295,727 tickets were purchased by the end of its theatrical run, placing it at the top of the French box-office for films released in 1973.

Notes

Further reading
 Mulvey, Michael. (2017). "What Was So Funny about Les Aventures de Rabbi Jacob (1973): A Comedic Film between History and Memory", French Politics, Culture & Society, 35(3), pp. 24–43  — The article puts the film into the political, moral, and cultural perspective of France of the times.

External links

 

1970s crime comedy films
1973 films
Films directed by Gérard Oury
Films scored by Vladimir Cosma
French crime comedy films
Italian crime comedy films
French satirical films
Italian satirical films
Films about kidnapping
Films about Jews and Judaism
Jewish comedy and humor
1970s French-language films
Religious comedy films
1970s satirical films
Films set in France
Films shot in France
1973 comedy films
1970s Italian films
1970s French films
French-language Italian films